Diego Confalonieri (born 11 April 1979) is a male Italian fencer. He won the bronze medal in the men's team épée event at the 2008 Summer Olympics.

Record against selected opponents
Includes results from all competitions 2006–present and athletes who have reached the quarterfinals at the World Championships or Olympic Games, plus those who have medaled in major team competitions.

  Gábor Boczkó 1-0
  Ignacio Canto 2-0
  Joaquim Videira 1-1
  Érik Boisse 1-0
  Dmytro Chumak 1-0
  Marcel Fischer 0-1
  Géza Imre 2-1
  Fabrice Jeannet 0-2
  Jérôme Jeannet 1-1
  Krisztián Kulcsár 0-1
  Guillermo Madrigal Sardinas 0-1
  Ulrich Robeiri 2-1
  Alfredo Rota 0-1
  Radosław Zawrotniak 1-1
  José Luis Abajo 1-2
  Anton Avdeev 1-2
  Sven Järve 1-0
  Matteo Tagliariol 1-0
  Yin Lian Chi 1-1
  Vitaly Zakharov 1-0
  Stefano Carozzo 1-0
  Silvio Fernández 0-1
  Nikolai Novosjolov 0-1
  Alexandru Nyisztor 1-0
  Tomasz Motyka 1-0
  Martin Schmitt 0-1
  Jörg Fiedler 1-0

References 

Italian épée fencers
Italian male fencers
Fencers at the 2008 Summer Olympics
Olympic fencers of Italy
Olympic bronze medalists for Italy
1979 births
Living people
Medalists at the 2008 Summer Olympics
Fencers of Centro Sportivo Carabinieri
Olympic medalists in fencing
21st-century Italian people